Jannie Boshoff (born 13 January 1986) is a South African rugby union footballer. His regular playing position is either as a winger or a centre. Although contracted to the Lions, he joined Griquas on loan for the 2012 Vodacom Cup and 2012 Currie Cup Premier Division campaigns.

External links 

itsrugby.co.uk profile

1986 births
Living people
Afrikaner people
Alumni of Maritzburg College
Golden Lions players
Griquas (rugby union) players
Lions (United Rugby Championship) players
Rugby union centres
Rugby union players from Newcastle, KwaZulu-Natal
Rugby union wings
South African rugby union players